Lady Eliza D'Oyly Traill-Burroughs (née Geddes, 9 May 1849 – 1 February 1908) was a British archaeologist. She described the discovery of Taversöe Tuick chambered cairn on the island of Rousay, Orkney, Scotland in May 1898 in her journal, which was published and discussed in Proceedings of the Society of Antiquaries of Scotland  in 1985.

She was born in 1849 and was the daughter of Colonel William Geddes of the Bengal Horse Artillery and his wife Emma. She married Lt-General Sir Frederick Traill-Burroughs (1831-1905) on 4 June 1870. He had inherited an estate on Rousay, and built the house Trumland in whose grounds the excavation took place. 

There is a memorial stone in St Magnus Cathedral, Kirkwall, with the words "Erected in loving memory of Sir Frederick W. Traill-Burroughs ... Also to the memory of his wife Lady Eliza Doyly Traill Burroughs, his faithful companion through storm and sunshine ...  Erected by her devoted niece Lady Sinclair of Dunbeath".

References

1849 births
1908 deaths
Scottish archaeologists
British women archaeologists
People from Orkney
Wives of knights